Eureka Township is one of the seventeen townships of Adair County, Iowa, United States.  At the 2020 census, its population was 101.

History
Eureka Township was organized in 1870. "Eureka!" is said to have exclaimed by an early settler when he discovered coal within the township borders.
It was served by Berea post office from 1894 to 1908, named after the Ancient Greek city of Berea.

Geography
According to the United States Census Bureau, Eureka Township covers an area of 35.59 square miles (92.19 square kilometers); of this, 0.05 square miles (0.13 square kilometers) or 0.14 percent is water.

Cities
 Fontanelle

Extinct towns
 Berea

Cemeteries
The township contains one cemetery, Eureka.

Major highways
  Iowa Highway 92

Lakes
 Nodaway Lake

Landmarks
 Ken Sidey Nature Area County Park
 Nodaway Park

School districts
 Nodaway Valley

Political districts
 Iowa's 4th congressional district
 State House District 58
 State Senate District 29

References
 United States Census Bureau 2007 TIGER/Line Shapefiles
 United States Board on Geographic Names (GNIS)
 United States National Atlas

External links
 US-Counties.com
 City-Data.com

Townships in Adair County, Iowa
Townships in Iowa
1870 establishments in Iowa
Populated places established in 1870